Phulahatta Parikauli  is a village development committee in Mahottari District in the Janakpur Zone of south-eastern Nepal. At the time of the 1991 Nepal census it had a population of 4226 people living in 737 individual households. The village has 6 Schools among which Damodar Academy is affiliated with CBSE. Currently Rabindra Yadav is the ward councillor of ward no. 9 from this village. The well known Om Prakash Jha also belongs from this area.

References

External links
UN map of the municipalities of Mahottari District

Populated places in Mahottari District